Hendricks Township may refer to:

 Hendricks Township, Shelby County, Indiana
 Hendricks Township, Chautauqua County, Kansas
 Hendricks Township, Michigan
 Hendricks Township, Lincoln County, Minnesota

Township name disambiguation pages